Scorton Feast is an annual event held at Scorton, North Yorkshire, England. Many activities are held on the raised village green, although there are currently several other key sites including Beck Green and the Archery field, the Gymkhana/Harness Racing field off Banks Lane, and the Flower Show tent on Bolton Road.

History
It is believed that Scorton Feast was first held in AD 1257 and it celebrated its 750th anniversary in 2006. The Feast has not, however, been held continuously over those 750 years.

The Feast is usually celebrated around August the 15th, which is the Festival of the Blessed Virgin Mary. The Feast is currently held over four days and commences on the third Sunday in August and ends on the following Wednesday.

Activities
The activities at Scorton Feast include (2013 event):

Sunday
 Open Clay Shoot
 Lads & Dads Cricket
 Challenge Cricket Match - Presidents XI v Scorton Feast XI
 Parish Quoits Competition
 Supa Relay Race
 The Company of Scorton Archers
 Reeth Brass Band
 Evening Service
 BBQ & Live Music
Monday
 Junior Football Matches
 Children's Sports
 Gymkhana
 Children's Garden Party
 Children's Entertainment
 Harness Racing
 Five-a-Side Football Competition
 Bowls Competition
Tuesday
 Girl's Rounders
 Children's Competitions
 Flower, Vegetable and Produce Show
 Ladies Cricket Match
 5 Mile Parish Cycle Race
 Scootering Demonstration
 Welly Throwing
 Old Tyme & Modern Sequence Dancing
Wednesday
 Kwik Cricket Match
 Children's Pet Show
 Fancy Dress Parade
 Adult Sports
 Open Air Concert
There is also a Scorton Arrow Hunt held Monday, Tuesday and Wednesday and a Funfair held on the evenings of all days except the Sunday.

Local folklore has it that the end of Scorton Feast coincides with the end of summer.

References

Festivals in North Yorkshire
Fairs in England
Festivals established in 1257